David J. Kimball is an American sound engineer. He was nominated for an Academy Award in the category Best Sound for the film Raging Bull.

Selected filmography
 Raging Bull (1980)

References

External links

Year of birth missing
Possibly living people
American audio engineers